Panganiban is a Filipino surname that may refer to
Angelica Panganiban (born 1986), Filipino film and television actress
Artemio Panganiban (born 1937), Supreme Court Chief Justice of the Philippines
Dominic Panganiban (born 1990), Filipino-Canadian YouTuber and animator
José María Panganiban (1863–1890), Filipino propagandist, linguist, and essayist
Jose Maria Panganiban Monument in Naga, Camarines Sur, Philippines
Jose Villa Panganiban (1903–1972), Filipino lexicographer, linguist, poet, playwright and lyricist

Tagalog-language surnames